Luigino Rinaldi (born ) is a former politician in Ontario, Canada. He was a Liberal member of the Legislative Assembly of Ontario from 2003 to 2011 and again from 2014 to 2018 who represented the ridings of Northumberland and Northumberland—Quinte West.

Background
Rinaldi moved to Canada with his family in 1960. He received an automotive technology diploma from George Brown College, and started a small business in the automotive field in 1972. He moved to Brighton, Ontario in 1980, having purchased Brighton Speedway, a family entertainment venue.

Politics
Rinaldi was appointed to council in the former Brighton township in 1992. He subsequently won election to the same position.  He was elected as deputy reeve and was appointed reeve of the township in 1998. In 2000 he was elected mayor of the newly amalgamated municipality of Brighton. As mayor, he presided over the establishment of the Brighton Health Services Centre in the community.

In the provincial election of 2003, Rinaldi defeated incumbent Progressive Conservative Doug Galt by about 2500 votes to become the new Member of Provincial Parliament (MPP) for Northumberland. The Liberals won the election, and Rinaldi was named Parliamentary Assistant (PA) to David Caplan, the Minister of Infrastructure, on October 23, 2003. He was re-elected in the provincial election of 2007 in the newly redistributed riding of Northumberland—Quinte West. He was appointed as PA to the Minister of Municipal Affairs and Housing.

In the provincial election of 2011 he was defeated by Progressive Conservative candidate Rob Milligan. In 2014, Rinaldi competed against Milligan again, this time defeating him by 3,887 votes.

In July 2014, he was reappointed as Parliamentary Assistant to the Minister of Municipal Affairs and Housing.

Electoral record

References

External links

1947 births
21st-century Canadian politicians
George Brown College alumni
Italian emigrants to Canada
Living people
Ontario Liberal Party MPPs